Rye Eclipse is an album by Canadian jazz pianist Kris Davis, which was recorded in 2007 and released on the Spanish Fresh Sound New Talent label.

Reception
The All About Jazz review by Troy Collins states, "Elegantly balancing magnanimous collective expression with challenging pre-written forms, Rye Eclipse is a stellar example of creative improvised music."

In a review for JazzTimes Thomas Conrad notes that, "In return for patience and trust and a wide-open mind, Kris Davis' music offers uncommon creative adventure."

Track listing
All compositions by Kris Davis except as indicated
 "Rye Eclipse" – 10:31
 "Wayne Oskar" – 4:11 
 "Prairie Eyes" – 5:29
 "Minnow Bucket" – 2:43
 "Empty Beehive" – 6:06
 "Samuro" – 3:09
 "Black Tunnel" – 7:30
 "Rye Resurrected" (Kris Davis, Tony Malaby, Eivind Opsvik, Jeff Davis) – 3:44

Personnel
Kris Davis – piano
Tony Malaby – saxophone
Eivind Opsvik – bass
Jeff Davis – drums

References

2008 albums
Kris Davis albums
Fresh Sound albums